Bruce Rasmussen (born March 18, 1961) is an American television producer and writer. He was supervising producer with the hit TV series Roseanne in 1992, for which he was awarded a Golden Globe, a Peabody, and a Humanitas Prize, and went on to produce The Drew Carey Show in 1995 and co-create Freddie in 2005. His other television credits include The Norm Show, Raines, Cane, Without a Trace, Trauma, The Middle, and The Defenders.

References

External links
 

1961 births
Living people
American television producers
American television writers
American male television writers
Writers from Bridgeport, Connecticut
American people of Jewish descent
Screenwriters from Connecticut